Broadwey  was a former village in the northern suburbs of Weymouth, Dorset, England. It lies on the B3159 road. In 2001, Broadwey and Upwey ward had a population of 4,349. St Nicholas' Church serves the suburb, as did Broadwey Methodist Church until 2021.

References

External links 

 Census data
 Dorset Online Parish Clerks

Villages in Dorset
Geography of Weymouth, Dorset